{{Infobox election
| election_name     = 2004 United States Senate election in Alaska
| country           = Alaska
| type              = presidential
| ongoing           = no
| previous_election = 1998 United States Senate election in Alaska
| previous_year     = 1998
| next_election     = 2010 United States Senate election in Alaska
| next_year         = 2010
| election_date     = November 2, 2004
| image_size        = x145px

| image1            = Lisa Murkowski.jpg
| nominee1          = Lisa Murkowski
| party1            = Republican Party (United States)
| popular_vote1     = 149,773
| percentage1       = 48.6%

| image2            = GovTonyKnowles (1).jpg
| nominee2          = Tony Knowles
| party2            = Democratic Party (United States)
| popular_vote2     = 140,424
| percentage2       = 45.6%

| title             = U.S. Senator
| before_election   = Lisa Murkowski
| before_party      = Republican Party (United States)
| after_election    = Lisa Murkowski
| after_party       = Republican Party (United States)
}}

The 2004 United States Senate election in Alaska''' took place on November 2, 2004, alongside other elections to the United States Senate in other states as well as elections to the United States House of Representatives, various state and local elections, and the presidential election of that year. Incumbent Republican U.S. Senator Lisa Murkowski of Anchorage, sought election to her first full term after being appointed by her father Frank Murkowski to serve out the rest of the latter's unexpired term when he resigned in December 2002 to become Governor of Alaska. Her main challenger was Democratic former governor Tony Knowles, her father's predecessor as governor. Murkowski won by a slight margin.

Background 

Although Alaska is heavily Republican, popular opinion had swung against the Murkowski family because of a tax increase passed by Governor Frank Murkowski, Lisa Murkowski's father. In addition, many voters disapproved of apparent nepotism in the appointment of Lisa Murkowski to the Senate. Knowles, who as mentioned above preceded Frank Murkowski as governor, had enlisted extensive out-of-state support for his bid to take over Lisa Murkowski's Senate seat. However, veteran Republican Senator Ted Stevens taped advertisements warning Alaskans that electing a Democrat could result in fewer federal dollars for Alaska.

Democratic primary

Candidates 
 Tony Knowles, businessman, former governor and former mayor of Anchorage
 Theresa Obermeyer, former Anchorage school board member
 Don Wright, former president of the Alaska Federation of Natives and perennial candidate

Results

Republican primary

Candidates 
 Jim Dore, aviation mechanic
 Mike W. Miller, businessman, former state senator, former state representative, nominee for lieutenant governor in 1994 and younger brother of Terry Miller
 Lisa Murkowski, incumbent U.S. Senator since 2002, formerly an Anchorage lawyer and member of the Alaska House
 Wev Shea, former U.S. Attorney for Alaska

Results

General election

Candidates

Major 
 Tony Knowles, former governor
 Lisa Murkowski (R), incumbent U.S. Senator

Minor 
 Ted Gianoutsos (I), lobbyist and activist on ANWR and veterans issues
 Scott Kohlhaas (L), party activist and perennial candidate
 Marc Millican (I), aviator, U.S. Air Force veteran
 Jerry Sanders (AI), businessman, former state representative
 Jim Sykes (G), party activist and perennial candidate

Campaign 
Lisa Murkowski had very low approval ratings as senator due to her father, Frank Murkowski, who at the time was the governor of Alaska with extremely low approval ratings himself. Former governor Tony Knowles ran against Murkowski. He ran as a Democrat who supported drilling in ANWR, in contrast to most Democrats. Alaska's senior senator, Ted Stevens, worked to "rescue" her campaign and help her maintain her seat.

Debates
Complete video of debate, October 26, 2004

Predictions

Polling

Results

See also 
 2004 United States Senate elections

References 

Senate, U.S.
Alaska
2004